Hammada is a genus of flowering plants belonging to the family Amaranthaceae. It is also in the Salsoloideae subfamily. Although it is a very unclear and unsorted genus with many species that have later been classed as synonyms.

Its native range is Central Asia and is found in Iraq, Lebanon, Palestine, Syria, Turkey and Uzbekistan. They are often found growing in alkaline or saline habitats.

Description
They are perennial plants, with a glabrous (smooth) wood (only at the base).
The weed-like plants have regular, minute, or small, cyclic flowers. The flowers have no petals, but 5 sepals which are united at the base. It has 5 stamens and the ovary is positioned superior and consists of 2 united carpels. Which late matures into a fruit (or seed capsule).

Known species
According to Plants of the World Online;
 Hammada eriantha Botsch. (from Uzbekistan)
 Hammada ramosissima (Boiss. ex Eig) Iljin (from Iraq, Lebanon, Palestine, Syria and Turkey)
 
Although, Schüssler in 2017, listed the following species; Hammada eriantha , Hammada griffithii , Hammada negevensis , 	Hammada salicornica ,  Hammada schmittiana  and Hammada thomsonii .

It is not known what the genus name of Hammada is in reference to, but Hamada in Arabic is a desert landscape.

It was first described and published in Bot. Zhurn. (Moscow & Leningrad) Vol.33 on page 582 in 1948.

The genus is not recognized by the United States Department of Agriculture and the Agricultural Research Service, as they list it as a synonym of Haloxylon .

Note; Hammada scoparia  a former species in the genus, is classed as an accepted synonym of Haloxylon scoparium .

References

Amaranthaceae
Amaranthaceae genera
Plants described in 1948
Flora of Uzbekistan
Flora of Western Asia